Sønderskov is a former manor house situated close to Brørup, 7 km southwest of Vejen, Vejen Municipality, in Southern Jutland, Denmark. The three-winged, white-washed main building dates from the 1620s and is surrounded by moats. It was listed on the Danish registry of protected buildings and places in 1918. It is now operated as a local historic museum.

History

Early history
Yje first known owner of Sønderskov is Niels Lagesen Rudbek. In 1390, he owned Sønderskov and Nielsbygaard. By 1448, S'nders kov had passed into the ownership of Jakob Nielsen through his marriage to the heir of its former owner. As he was not of noble descent he was not entitled to own a manor and he therefore chose to transfer the property to Ribe Cathedral Chapter. It is not known when exactly the cathedral chapter parted with the estate but it was by 1483 owned by Henrik Steen who was related to Jakob Nielsen's wife.

Galskyt and Rosenkrantz

On Steen's death Sønderskov was divided between his son Niels Steen and daughter Anne Steensdatter. Anne Steensdatter eventually took over her brother's share of the estate. She brought it into her marriage to Thomas Galskyt. Sønderskov remained in the Galskytte family until the end of the century.  A new main building with two diagonally placed towers was constructed in the middle of the century. Thomas Galskyt's two sonswho both owned Sønderskovwere both killed bu fellow noblemen. In 1554, PederGalskyt was killed by Johan Juel. In 1574, Otto Galskyt was killed by Jakob Skram.

Peder Galskyt's widow Bege Clausdatter survived her son Albert. Her son-in-law Christoffer Rosenkrantz was later executed for embezzkement. In 1600, she sold Sønderskov to Børge Rosenkrantz. He kept Sønderskov until his death in 164, but spent most of his time on his Scanian estate Ørup.

Juel and Due
On Rosenkrantz's death in 1614 Sønderskov was sold to Thomas Juel. He was already the owner of nearby Estrup Manor. Sønderskov's main building was shortly after the sale destroyed by fire. Juel immediately embarked on the construction of a new main building. The Renaissance-style building was completed in 1620.

In 1620, Juel  completed a new main building on his estate.

Thomas Juel's nephew Manderup Due  inherited Sønderskov from his uncle in 1648. He was also a fiefholder in Thy. His holdings were later passed down to his son Jørgen Skeel Due. He spent considerably more time on the Sønderskov estate than his father had done. In the 1690s, he purchased Føvling Church.

After Jørgen Skeel Due's death, the estate was taken over by his son, Jens Christoffer Due, who was heavily in debt. In 1720, he had to mortage the estate to Hans Bachmann.

Bachmann and Claudius

The ownership of Sønderskov was eventually transferred to Bachmann. He was only survived by his wife Christina Margrethe Bachmann (née Claussen) with one year. On her death in 1746 Sønderskov passed to their, Christine Margrethe Bachmann, who three years later brought it into marriage to Samuel Nicolaus Claudius. He served as county manager of Løgumkloster. In 1753, he installed a new pulpit and alterpiece in Gøvling Church.

Claudius wanted to improve the management of the estate but ended up losing a legal dispute with copyholders.

Changing owners, 17691818

In 1769, Claudius sold Sønderskov to Jens Fr. Wodschou. The next owner was Frederik Christian Otto Wedel Jarlsberg. His other holdings included Basnæs on Zealand and Glorup on Funen. He died at Sønderskov in 1779. The estate changed hands many times over the next decades while Many of the copyholds were converted into freeholds and some of the land that belonged to the manor was sold off in lots.

Momsen family
In 1818, Sønderskov was acquired by Peder Momsen. The estate was suvsequently owned by members of the Momsen family for more than one hundred years.

20th century
In 1925, it was acquired by J. Bundsgaard in exchange for other land. The estate then once again changed hands many times over the next years. In the 1970s it fell into a state of disrepair. In 1986 it was acquired by master carpenter Helge Kragelund. He undertook a comprehensive renovation of the main building over the next seven years.

Architecture
The three-winged main building dates from the 1620s. It is a white-washed brick building with visible wall anchors and a pitched roof clad in red tile. The roof ridge is pierced by four white-wahsed brick chimneys. The three wings are of similar height but the northern main wing is only divided into two storeys whereas the two side wings (east and west) are divided into three storeys.

The building is surrounded by moats. The surrounding park has a large vegetable garden.

Interior
The museum's vestibule feature a large rune stone from the 9th century. The ticket office is decorated with the interior furnishings of an old grocery shop. A room on the first floor features a set of canvas tapestries with eight scene's from François de Salignac de la Mothe‑Fénelon's 1699 novel Les Aventures de Télémaque. They were most likely installed during Claudius’ ownership in 1750‑1769. Another mural is based on one  of Jacob de Gheyn's illustrations for the 1717 117 engravings for the military manual The Exercise of Armes.

List of owners
List of owners:
 (1448)Jakob Nielsen
 (1448-1483)Ribe kapitel
 (1483-1505)Henrik Steen
 ( - )Niels Henriksen Steen
 (1532)Thomas Galskyt
 (1548-1550)Peder Galskyt
 (1550- )Otto Galskyt
 (1572-1593)Albert Galskyt
 (1593-1600)Bege Clausdatter Emmiksen, gift Galskyt
 ( -1600)Christoffer Rosenkrantz
 ( -1600)Johanne Galskyt
 (1600-1614)Børge Rosenkrantz
 (1611)Palle Rosenkrantz
 (1614-1647)Thomas Juel
 (1647-1648)Maren Bølle, gift Juel
 (1649-1660)Manderup Due
 (1660-1701)Jørgen Skeel Due
 (1701-1718)Albert Skeel Due
 (1718- )Jørgen Christoffer Due
 ( -1745)Hans Bachmann
 (1745-1746)Christina Margrethe Clausen, gift Bachmann
 (1746-1750)Christine Margrethe Bachmann, gift Claudius
 (1750-1769)Samuel Nicolaus Claudius
 (1769-1775)Jens Fr. Wodschou
 (1775-1776)Frederik Christian Otto Wedel Jarlsberg
 (1776-1779)Boet efter Frederik Christian Otto Wedel Jarlsberg
 (1779-1784)Søren Bjerring
 (1784)T.J. de Thygeson
 (1784-1793)Hans Gundorph
 (1793-1797)Jens Hundevadt
 (1797-1804)Christian Saxesen
 (1804-1812)Peter Momsen
 (1812)Interesssentselskab:C. Thomsen, Ditlev Monrad og A.N. Flensborg
 (1812)V. Tersling
 (1812-1815)Henrik J. G. Grandjean
 (1815-1819)Joachim G. Wedell-Wedellsborg
 (1819-1846)Peter Momsen
 (1846-1887)Jens Rahr Momsen
 (1887-1894)Enkefru Momsen
 (1894-1925)Peter Momsen
 (1925)J. Bundsgaard
 (1925-1926)Frederik Legarth
 (1926-1927)A. Krause
 (1927-1929)M. Andersen
 (1929-1939)Niels Brüel
 (1939-1962)Johannes Lind
 (1962- )D. Karstens
 (1986- )Helge Kragelund
 ( - )Museet på Søndersko* v

Gallery

References

Extermal links
 Sønderskov Hovedgård at ribewiki.dk 

Listed buildings and structures in Vejen Municipality
Listed castles and manor houses in Denmark
Local museums in Denmark
Houses completed in 1620

da:Sønderskov Herregård